Daring-class destroyer may refer to:

 Daring-class destroyer (1893),  Royal Navy ships launched in 1893 and 1894
 Daring-class destroyer (1949),  Royal Navy ships launched during the late 1940s and through the 1950s
 Type 45 destroyer, also known as Daring class,  Royal Navy ships launched from 2006 onwards

See also
 Daring (keelboat), a class of keelboat raced in Cowes